Olpad is one of the 182 Legislative Assembly constituencies of Gujarat state in India. It is part of Surat district.

List of segments
This assembly seat represents the following segments,

 Olpad Taluka
 Choryasi Taluka (Part) Villages – Vansva, Damka, Malgama, Bhesan, Okha, Chichi, Vanakala, Vihel, Variav, Bharthana Kosad, Kosad, Asarma, Mota Varachha, Amroli, Chhapra Bhatha (CT), Utran (CT)

Members of Legislative Assembly

Election results

2022

2017

2012

2007

2002

See also
 List of constituencies of Gujarat Legislative Assembly
 Gujarat Legislative Assembly

References

External links
 

Assembly constituencies of Gujarat
Surat district